References to Zion and Jerusalem in classical Jewish prayer and ritual are significant. The liturgy includes many explicit references too:
Zion and Jerusalem  are mentioned 5 times in the 18-blessing Amidah prayer, the central prayer of the Jewish liturgy, which calls for the restoration of Jerusalem to the Jewish nation. It is said while facing towards Jerusalem:
"And to Jerusalem your city may you return....Blessed are you, builder of Jerusalem." "May our eyes behold your return to Zion...Blessed are you, who restores his presence to Zion."
The Mussaf prayer states:
"But because of our sins we have been exiled from our land and sent far from our soil...Draw our scattered ones near from among the nations, and bring in our dispersions from the ends of the earth. Bring us to Zion your city in glad song, and to Jerusalem home of your sanctuary in eternal joy."
 As part of the Jewish Torah Service, on the Sabbath, Mondays, Thursdays, New Months, and almost every major Jewish Holiday, when the Torah scroll is removed from the ark for reading, the congregation sings:

     "Ki Mitzion: "For out of Zion shall go forth the Torah, and the word of the Lord from Jerusalem."  "״   ״כִּי מִצִּיוֹן תֵּצֵא תוֹרָה ודבר ה׳ ירוּשָׁלָֽיִם 

The Ya'a'le Ve-Yavo prayer mentions the "remembrance of Jerusalem, the city of your holiness."
In the Grace After Meals which is recited after partaking of a meal eaten with bread, the following is said:
"Have mercy Lord, our God...on Jerusalem Your city, on Zion the resting place of Your glory..." and "Rebuild Jerusalem, the holy city, soon in our days. Blessed are you God who rebuilds Jerusalem in His mercy, Amen."
After partaking of a light meal, the thanksgiving blessing states:
"Have mercy, Lord, our God...on Jerusalem, Your city; and on Zion, the resting place of Your glory... Rebuild Jerusalem, the city of holiness, speedily in our days. Bring us up into it and gladden us in its rebuilding and let us eat from its fruit and be satisfied with its goodness and bless You upon it in holiness and purity.”
On Tisha B'av the "Nachem" prayer is inserted to the Mincha Amidah in the Ashkenazic tradition. It asks God to comfort those who mourn the destruction of Zion and Jerusalem. The prayer begins with
"Comfort, Lord our God, the mourners of Zion and the mourners of Jerusalem..."
It concludes with "Blessed art Thou, Lord, who brings comfort to Zion and rebuilds Jerusalem."*In the "Hashkiveinu" prayer on the Sabbath eve, the conclusion of the blessing is changed to: "Blessed are You Lord, who spreads the shelter of peace over us, over His entire people Israel, and over Jerusalem."

See also
Zionides

References

Jewish prayer and ritual texts